Kontron AG is a German-based multinational company which designs and manufactures embedded computer modules, boards and systems.

Kontron AG serves original equipment manufacturers, system integrators and application providers of different market segments (amongst others: Industrial automation, communications, transportation, energy, avionics, medical, infotainment, and military). Kontron develops, manufactures and sells its products worldwide. Kontron is a premier member of the Intel Embedded Alliance.
The corporate group is headquartered in Augsburg and consists of the Kontron Europe GmbH (Ismaning, Augsburg, Deggendorf, and Saarbrücken). Other locations are in San Diego, Fremont, California, Montreal, Plzeň, Toulon, Bangalore, Taipei, Tokyo and Beijing. Kontron acquired Dolch in 2005.

At a trade show called Embedded World in 2007, Kontron introduced a product called the UGM-M72 using a "Universal Graphics Module".
The card used the M72S from ATI Technologies, and was 84 x 95 mm.
A version 1.1 of UGM was published in July 2008,
and Advanced Micro Devices (AMD, the parent company of ATI) announced it would support the UGM in August 2008.
A web site promoting the module was co-sponsored by XGI Technology until the Great Recession in 2009.

In August 2017 Kontron was merged into Austria-based S&T Group.

References

External links

Computer hardware companies of Germany
Companies based in Augsburg
Computer companies established in 1959
Electronics companies established in 1959
Multinational companies headquartered in Germany
German brands